Toivo Elias Haapanen (15 May 1889 – 22 July 1950) was a Finnish conductor and music scholar.

Early life and education

Haapanen was born in 1889 in Karvia, Finland. His sister was the writer Tyyni Tuulio. His son is the violinist Tuomas Haapanen.

After high school, he began playing the violin. Starting in 1907 studied the violin and music theory at the Helsinki Philharmonic Orchestra school. He completed in his studies in 1911. In 1918, he graduated from the University of Helsinki with a Bachelor of Arts. In 1925, he received his Ph.D.

Career

Haapenen became Chief Conductor of the Finnish Radio Symphony Orchestra in 1929. He served in this position until 1951. Starting in 1946, he also served as Music Manager of the Finnish Broadcasting Company. He was also a professor at the University of Helsinki.

As a conductor, Haapanen traveled throughout Europe, including Germany, Poland, Hungary and Italy. As a musical scholar, he collected and studied Medieval Finnish music, dating from 1050 to 1522. The collection is held by the University of Helsinki Library. He wrote a history of Finnish music in 1940. He also worked as a magazine music critic from 1919 to 1929. He served on two committees, including chairman of the Finnish council on music from 1943 until 1950.

References

External links
 

1889 births
1950 deaths
People from Karvia
People from Turku and Pori Province (Grand Duchy of Finland)
20th-century conductors (music)
Finnish conductors (music)
University of Helsinki alumni
Academic staff of the University of Helsinki